The Paramount Arts Center is a historic theater located in Ashland, Kentucky, in the United States.  Listed as the Paramount Theatre on the National Register of Historic Places, this theater is an important part of theater in Kentucky.

History
The Paramount Arts Center, at that time known as the Paramount Theater, was one of the first transitional theatres built for "talking pictures" and was to be a model theatre for others around the country to showcase films produced by Paramount Pictures. The Great Depression, however, soon changed the course of events for the theater, as Paramount had decided to do away with the project altogether. The plans were picked up by an Ashland-based company with Paramount craftsmen providing the interior furnishings - and the building was then leased to Paramount Publix Corporation.

In 2001, Mike Myers of Ashland reported that the original general contractor was Wade Gates of Ashland. Gates's secretary, Marie Duncan, provided this information.

The Paramount first opened on September 5, 1931, and closed forty years later in 1971. In 1972, the Greater Ashland Foundation (Foundation for the Tri-State Community), was created. Under the leadership of Ashland Oil Inc. Foundation President Paul G. Blazer, Jr. (son of Ashland Oil & Refining Company founder Paul G. Blazer) one half of the corpus of the terminating Stuart M. Blazer [family] Foundation was gifted and used for the Greater Ashland Foundation's purchase of the Paramount Theatre and establishing it as a performing arts center.  It opened that same year under the new name "Paramount Arts Center". The theater has undergone several renovations since 1972, most recently in 2002 when a new stagehouse was added and new dressing rooms, rehearsal space and banquet facility were added in a nearby building that was purchased in 1998. In addition, this renovated space was connected to the main building.

The theater now operates as a non-profit organization, showing symphonies, Broadway plays, ballets and other productions. In addition, in 1992 the music video for the song "Achy Breaky Heart" by Billy Ray Cyrus was filmed here.

2006 water damage
The Paramount Arts Center suffered major water damage in November 2006. It occurred when a beauty pageant contestant hung a dress from a water sprinkler while using a steamer to remove wrinkles. Heat from the steam set off the sprinkler system. Water poured from the second floor causing close to $30,000 US dollars in damage to the building.1

Haunting
It is said that during early renovation work on the Paramount Theatre, a death occurred there and the man's ghost has since haunted the Paramount. According to the story, in the early 1940s, four construction workers from Boyd Theater Company in Cincinnati, Ohio were working on a project inside the auditorium. It is reported that all of them had gone to lunch except one man, named Joe. When the other three returned, they are said to have found Joe hanging from the curtain rigging, dead. Allegedly, since that time, sounds have been heard, things have gone missing, cold drafts have been felt, and the image of a man has been seen to appear on occasion. Despite this, most versions of the story refer to Joe as a "good ghost"—one who seems to look out for the benefit of the theatre and its occupants.

When Billy Ray Cyrus was at the Paramount filming his video for "Achy Breaky Heart," he was told about the legend of Paramount Joe. It is customary to get 8 x 10 photographs signed by each performer that appears at the Paramount and then hang the photo on the 'Wall of Fame' in the box office. Billy Ray autographed large color posters to each of the female employees working here at the time - and one with a personal inscription to Paramount Joe, whom he now had a fondness for. Each woman put her poster near her desk and Joe's was hung in the box office, near all the other performers. As time passed and the walls in the box office became too full of 8x10's signed by other performers, the executive director felt that some of the pictures and posters needed to come down. Nobody wanted to take their personally autographed picture of Billy Ray down so they took down the one he had signed to Paramount Joe. The next day, the story has it that every 8x10 and poster that had been hanging neatly on the walls the night before were now lined strewn on the floor, many of their glass frames shattered. Paramount Joe's poster still hangs in the Paramount, in part of The Marquee Room, which is now the site of Paramount Joe's Rising Star Café.

In 2004, marketing director Tyson Compton was giving a tour to some high school students. As he was relating the Paramount Joe story, he realized that he was always talking about Joe, and not to him. So as he spoke to the students, he stopped and called out, "Joe, are you here? Is it okay that I tell your story?" While he swears that he then heard a seat squeak, that is not the most chilling part of this story. Compton relates how he received a call the next day from a psychic who lived in the area. She asked him if someone in his family or a close friend had recently died because she had gotten a message from "the other side." She said, "I'm supposed to tell you that Joe said he is here."

The Paramount Players
The Paramount Players are a group of local actors that come together and audition for the various straight plays and musicals that are produced under the direction of Paramount Arts Center's Director of Education.

The Paramount Players have won several awards including Kentucky Theatre Association Outstanding Production for RENT and Cabaret, IMEA Award for Best Musical for CATS and RENT, and Best Director And Best Choreography.

References

External links
Center website

Performing arts centers in Kentucky
National Register of Historic Places in Boyd County, Kentucky
Ashland, Kentucky
Cinemas and movie theaters in Kentucky
Music venues in Kentucky
Movie palaces
Art Deco architecture in Kentucky
Tourist attractions in Boyd County, Kentucky
Theatres on the National Register of Historic Places in Kentucky
1931 establishments in Kentucky
Theatres completed in 1931
Individually listed contributing properties to historic districts on the National Register in Kentucky